Your OWN Show: Oprah's Search for the Next TV Star is a reality competition show, created by Oprah Winfrey. The show aired from January 7, 2011 to February 25, 2011 on the Oprah Winfrey Network.

Hosted by Nancy O'Dell and Carson Kressley, it featured ten prospective television hosts competing to earn their own television show on the OWN network. Each week, the contestants competed in a themed-television show challenge, where they were watched and judged by O'Dell, Kressley, and a guest judge and mentor, whose expertise is in the theme that week. After the production and filming, one contestant was eliminated, until the best host remained. Zach Anner and Kristina Kuzmic-Crocco were both chosen as the winners. Besides winning their television show, the champions also received $100,000 and a 2011 Chevrolet Equinox.

The executive producer was Mark Burnett, who has produced many reality competitions, such as The Apprentice, Survivor, and Design Star.

Contestants
Out of the thousands who applied, ten contestants were chosen to compete.

Contestant Progress

 (WINNER) The host won the series and received their own show.
 (WIN) The host was the executive producer of the winning team.
 (HIGH) The host was on the winning team. (Episode 7 had individual interviews)
 (IN) The host was on the losing team, but was safe.
 (LOW) The host was mentioned as one of the worst, and was a candidate for elimination, while ultimately not being chosen.
 (LOW) The host was in the bottom two, took part in the elimination interview, and was saved.
 (OUT) The host was eliminated.
 (WD) The host voluntarily withdrew from the competition.
 (*) The host was the losing team's executive producer.

Episodes

Episode 1: "It Takes A Village"
First Aired: January 7, 2011
Television show theme: Sex and relationships
Guest mentor and judge: Dr. Phil
Summary: The ten contestants arrive at OWN studios, where they are greeted by O'Dell, Kressley, and Oprah herself. The hosts are split into two teams: a women's (Team Vision) and men's (Team Focus). As there are only four men, they choose Alicia to join their team, and even out the numbers. They are informed of their first challenge, to interview people on the street on the topic of sex and relationships, and then discuss the questions brought up with this week's guest mentor, Dr. Phil. As an added twist, the teams are required to interview the opposite sex. Alicia and Elizabeth step up to the challenge of being the executive producers for their teams' segments. When rehearsing with Dr. Phil, both teams have to readjust parts of their segments, but overall Team Focus shows more potential. This proves true when they produce a much better segment than Team Vision. At elimination, Team Focus is announced as the winning team, and Team Vision is asked who is responsible for their loss. All of the women say executive producer Elizabeth is, but Elizabeth chooses Aunt Flora, who she says did nothing. The judges deliberate, mentioning Elizabeth, Kristina, and Leigh as the most responsible for producing the terrible segment. In the end, they choose Elizabeth (who let her team down as executive producer) and Leigh (who was a rude host, cutting Dr. Phil off) as the bottom two. They both must do a short one-on-one interview with Dr. Phil to prove they should stay. Elizabeth delivers with an insightful topic she can relate to (family member with a disability). Leigh does not show improvement in her interview, and once again interrupts Dr. Phil. Leigh becomes the first host sent home.
 Host Eliminated: Leigh Koechner

Episode 2: "Let the Transformations Begin"
First Aired: January 14, 2011
Television show theme: Beauty makeovers
Guest mentor and judge: Vera Wang
 Host Eliminated: Eric Warren

Episode 3: "Who Gets the Last Laugh?"
First Aired: January 21, 2011
Television show theme: Late-night comedy segment
Guest mentor and judge: Arsenio Hall
 Host Eliminated: Aunt Flora

Episode 4: "Get the Salmon in the Pan"
First Aired: January 28, 2011
Television show theme: Cooking show
Guest mentor and judge: Curtis Stone
 Host Eliminated (withdrew): Tony Roach

Episode 5: "Do It With Style"
First Aired: February 4, 2011
Television show theme: Thirty second commercial for Kohl's & a television interview (with Fuentes)
Guest mentor and judge: Daisy Fuentes
 Host Eliminated: Elizabeth Espinosa

Episode 6: "Dollars and Sense"
First Aired: February 11, 2011
Television show theme: Financial advice
Guest mentor and judge: Suze Orman
 Hosts Eliminated: Ryan O'Conner, Alicia Taylor

Episode 7: "I Have Some Questions for You"
First Aired: February 18, 2011
Television show theme: Press junket (as applied to promoting their own TV show)
Guest mentor and judge: Gayle King
Summary: The episode opens with O'Dell and Kressley informing Zach, Kristina and Terey that Ryan and Alicia were both eliminated and that the remaining challenges would be individual.  After the opening credits, O'Dell and Kressley brief the final three about the press junket at the Sheraton Universal hotel, and bring out guest mentor Gayle King to advise them before the interviews on how to handle the press and promote the network.  The contestants interview with both Craig Tomashoff of TV Guide and Kevin Frazier of Entertainment Tonight.  They are then told about a third interview to complete, and the guest interviewer is none other than Oprah herself. Zach is the only one who takes the initiative to ask Oprah insightful questions during what could be a once in a lifetime opportunity. Following the interviews, they return to OWN Studios and chat about their "Oprah moment" before they pose for publicity photographs. When they return to Stage 2, O'Dell and Kressley reveal that Gayle had been watching all the interviews, and they discuss how the junket went and that all three bring something unique to the table before adding that a final interview with Gayle could decide the finalists. In elimination, Zach is praised for being steady throughout the competition, and O'Dell announces he is the first finalist. While Kristina and Terey both did well, they felt Terey's direction for her show was not clear enough, and chose Kristina as the other finalist.
 Host Eliminated: Terey Summers

Episode 8: "And the Winner Is..."

Television show theme:  Producing a pilot episode for their own TV show
Guest mentor and judge: Mark Burnett
 Host Eliminated: None
 Winner of their OWN show: Kristina Kuzmic-Crocco and Zach Anner

External links
 
 

Oprah Winfrey Network original programming
2011 American television series debuts
2011 American television series endings
2010s American reality television series
English-language television shows
Oprah Winfrey
Television series by MGM Television